Stone Protectors is a 1993 multi-media entertainment property consisting primarily of an action figure line and animated series. The series also had a tie-in video game released for the Super NES and the Sega Genesis. It served as a late attempt to market the troll doll craze of the early 1990s to young boys. While not particularly successful, nor inspired by a prior medium, Stone Protectors generally followed in the same vein as contemporaries including Toxic Crusaders, Swamp Thing, and the highly popular Teenage Mutant Ninja Turtles.

Back-story
A kingdom built of crystals came under attack by the reptilian troll-like Saurians whose leader, Zok, desired the powerful crystals protected by the Empress. Zok broke into the castle and reached for the crystals only to see them explode into pieces and fly to Earth.

After being thrown out the back door of a New York City club, an awful rock band known as the Rock Detectors found the five magical stones which gave them troll-like appearances and special skills (not the least of which is playing good music). This put them at odds with the music-hating Zok and his henchman Zink, collectively known as The Protectors.

 Cornelius, the group's leader, holds the green stone and became a samurai with an assortment of appropriate weaponry (katana, shuriken, and a pair of nunchaku made of microphones). He is the band's lead singer, but also plays the guitar.
 Chester holds the red stone, became an expert at wrestling and received great strength. He plays the bass guitar and saxophone.
 Clifford "Cliff" holds the blue stone and became an expert rock climber. He is the band's drummer.
 Angus holds the yellow stone and became a soldier excelling in military combat, as well as turning ordinary objects into weapons. He plays the keyboard. Angus ostensibly built up the Protectors' bizarre attack vehicles from things like barbecues and lawnmowers.
 Maxwell holds the orange stone and became an "accelerator" - an athletic speedster who sports in-line skates. He plays the guitar.

Animated series
A short-lived cartoon series based on the characters debuted in 1993. In it, Empress Opal of Mythrandir splits the legendary Great Crystal into six pieces to keep it out of Zok's hands. Zok manages to capture one piece, but the other five bond with the future Stone Protectors, spiriting them away to Mythrandir to help Opal upset Zok's schemes and spread a sentiment of peace and freedom with their music. The series lasted one season; 8 out of 13 episodes were released on VHS in 1994 by Family Home Entertainment, the whole series was released on VHS in England. A Texas-based streaming service called Comix.tv has acquired the intellectual property rights to Stone Protectors from former owner Kam Toys. On March 2, 2021, a Kickstarter campaign was launched to get the entire 13-episode series released to DVD. The initial goal for the Kickstarter was $30,000 with further stretch goals such as a comic book, Blu-ray and a new episode for the series. The Kickstarter only met its funding goal on March 29, 2021.

It is notable that while the advertisements for the action figures attempted to tie the Stone Protectors into the troll doll fad, the cartoon seemed eager to avoid the comparison. For instance, it replaced the line "trolls on a roll" from the theme song in the commercials with "Don't you know?"

The series has also been broadcast on the BBC in England, RTB in Brunei, TV2 in Malaysia, Bop TV in South Africa, ZBC in Zimbabwe, Channel 33 in the United Arab Emirates and TV2 in New Zealand.

Episodes
1. Forged in Fire (written by Martin Isenberg & Robert Skir)

2. Stranded in Mythrandir (written by Peter Lawrence)

3. Levity (written by Matthew Malach)

4. Return of Blackheart (written by J. Larry Carroll and David Bennett Carren)

5. Weaponogs (written by Richard T. Murphy)

6. Fan or Foe (written by Chris Hubbell & Sam Graham)

7. Island Hopping (written by Martin Isenberg & Robert Skir)

8. Digging In (written by Peter Lawrence)

9. Between Zok and the Deep Blue Sea (written by Grant Morgan)

10. The Test (written by J. Larry Carroll & David Bennett Carren)

11. The Crystal Vampire (unaired) (written by Matthew Cartsonis & Peter Lawrence)

12. The Wall of Sound (unaired) (written by Richard T. Murphy)

13. Going Home (unaired) (written by Sam Graham & Chris Hubbell)

Action figures
The Stone Protectors action figures were produced by the Ace Novelty Toy Company. All of the figures were roughly 5" tall and featured cut joints at the neck, shoulders, and elbows as well as ball joints at the hips. Their heads were a soft, rubbery material with tall, synthetic hair sticking straight out the top. In rotating the right arm of a Stone Protectors figure, a flint module would ignite inside its chest, creating a quick yet bright flash seen through the translucent chest emblem. A second series of sports-themed figures was also released. Princess Opal was never made as a figure, nor were there any generic Saurian Guards.

The toyline as well as the cartoon that followed it were seen as poor imitations of the popular Teenage Mutant Ninja Turtles line of toys and cartoon series and overlooked by many.

Video game

A Super NES game based on the property was released in November 1994 by Kemco. A Genesis version was developed and completed, but not released back then. This version, intended to be published by Vic Tokai, was finally leaked to the public in 2010 by Nesplayer.com. It was finally given an official release by Piko Interactive in March 2022, together with a re-release of the SNES version.

Stone Protectors features 10 levels in which the heroes – Clifford, Cornelius, Chester, Maxwell, and Angus – battle The Predators throughout their mission to retrieve Zok's crystal and bring them all back to the kingdom. Weapons can also be acquired but only used by certain characters. Depending on the difficulty setting, the game's ending scene also features different music in which the Stone Protectors are seen performing as a band.

GamePro gave the game a generally negative review, commenting that the graphics are good but the animation is poor, and the controls make it difficult to pull off special attacks or counteract enemy attacks. They concluded that the game, while not without merits, is overall "a frustrating journey."

Other merchandise
Pressman Toy Corp. released a Stone Protectors board game. In late 1993, Harvey Comics debuted Stone Protectors "Premiere Issue" (effectively an issue #0), followed by issues #1–3.

References

External links
Stone Protectors (action figures) at Virtual Toy Chest
Stone Protectors (animated series) at Blast from the Past
Stone Protectors (video game) at Eurocom
 Stone Protectors theme song at YouTube
 

1990s toys
1990s American animated television series
1993 American television series debuts
1993 American television series endings
1993 comics debuts
Mass media franchises introduced in 1993
1994 video games
Action figures
American children's animated action television series
American children's animated superhero television series
BBC children's television shows
Beat 'em ups
Cooperative video games
Dam dolls
Fictional musical groups
Fictional trolls
First-run syndicated television programs in the United States
Harvey Comics superheroes
Harvey Comics titles
Sega Genesis games
Super Nintendo Entertainment System games
Superhero teams
Superhero video games
Television superheroes
TVNZ 2 original programming
Video games developed in the United Kingdom
Mass media franchises
Eurocom games
Kemco games
Side-scrolling video games